USCGC Eagle may refer to:

 , was a "100-foot"  patrol boat, commissioned in 1925 and transferred to the U.S. Navy in 1936
 , is a Gorch Fock-class barque originally commissioned as Segelschulschiff Horst Wessel, a German training vessel taken as war reparations by the United States and commissioned into the Coast Guard in 1946; she is still in active service

See also
 
 

Ships of the United States Coast Guard